The Torre de la Plata is an octagonal military tower in Andalusia, located in present-day Seville, southern Spain. It was constructed by the Almohad Caliphate.

History
The tower dates from the thirteenth century and was linked by the city wall to another Moorish fortification, the Torre del Oro.

The neglected tower had been overgrown with vegetation and occupied by homeless people. It was restored in 1992.

See Also
Torre del Oro

Towers completed in the 13th century
Plata
Buildings and structures in Seville
Moorish architecture in Spain
Almohad architecture